Broadway and North Fountain Street Historic District is a national historic district located at Cape Girardeau, Cape Girardeau County, Missouri.  The district encompasses four contributing buildings in the central business district of Cape Girardeau built between 1907 and 1937. Located in the district is the separately listed Mission Revival style Marquette Hotel.  The remaining buildings are the Surety Savings and Loan Association (c. 1924), Himmelberger & Harrison Building (1907), and Rueseler Motor Company (c. 1916, 1937).

It was listed on the National Register of Historic Places in 2003.

References

Historic districts on the National Register of Historic Places in Missouri
Commercial buildings on the National Register of Historic Places in Missouri
Mission Revival architecture in Missouri
Historic districts in Cape Girardeau County, Missouri
National Register of Historic Places in Cape Girardeau County, Missouri